Glenaire may refer to:

 Glenaire, Missouri, United States, a city
 Glenaire, Virginia, United States, an unincorporated community
 Glenaire, Victoria, Shire of Colac Otway, Victoria, Australia